William Francis Trump (November 7, 1923 – July 24, 2009) served aboard a Landing Craft Infantry vessel during four amphibious assaults, during World War II.
His vessel, the USS LCI-90, participated in the invasion of French North Africa, Sicily and Anzio in 1943, and in the Invasion of Normandy in 1944.
It was during the Invasion of Normandy that Trump earned a Silver Star.
He volunteered to venture onto the Omaha Beach and anchor a safety line for the 200 soldiers his vessel carried to follow ashore.
Trump had to make his way past heavily mined beach fortifications, while under heavy enemy fire.
His helmet was creased by a German bullet.
 
Trump lied about his age, and enlisted in the Coast Guard in 1941 at 17 years old.
He retired as a chief petty officer, in 1965

After retirement Trump joined the Merchant Marine, serving for fifteen years aboard vessels of Belcher Oil Company.

Only eleven other members of the Coast Guard have been awarded silver stars.

USCGC William Trump

In 2010 when the Coast Guard decided that all the new Sentinel class cutters would be named after Coast Guard enlisted personnel who had been recognized for their heroism; Trump was one of those to be honored.
The eleventh cutter in the class will be named the USCGC William Trump.  She will be homeported in Key West, Florida.
Trump's eight children attended a dedication ceremony at the Bollinger Shipyards in Louisiana in March 2012.  Trump's eldest grandson, Jeremy Trump, became a Navy SEAL, saying that it was only after he enlisted that he and his grandfather discussed his record.

References

1923 births
2009 deaths
United States Coast Guard personnel of World War II
Recipients of the Silver Star
People from Bloomsburg, Pennsylvania
Military personnel from Pennsylvania